Northern Lights is a 2001 Russian romantic drama film directed by Andrey Razenkov.

Plot 
The film tells about a girl who lives without a father whom she has never seen, but whom sincerely loves. After twenty years of waiting, she sets off in search of him.

Cast 
 Marina Aleksandrova as Anya
 Aleksandr Zbruyev as Sergey / Anya's Father / Doctor
 Irina Apeksimova as Natalya
 Elena Koreneva as Anya's Mother
 Daniil Strakhov as Vadim / Anya's Fiancé
 Mikhail Ulyanov as Old man in the country house

References

External links 
 

2001 films
2000s Russian-language films
Russian romantic drama films
2001 romantic drama films